The 2012 Nehru Cup Final was a match that took place on 2 September 2012 at the Jawaharlal Nehru Stadium in Delhi, India between India and Cameroon. India won the match in the penalty shoot out 5–4 after the match ended 2–2 after 120 minutes. India became the winner for the third successive time.

The teams during the tournament
India entered the tournament as reigning champions after winning the 2009 Nehru Cup at the Ambedkar Stadium. However they also came into the tournament following an all defeat performance at the 2012 AFC Challenge Cup but they also came into the tournament with an added optimism as India got a new head coach in Dutchman Wim Koevermans.

Cameroon on the other hand came in with an all-domestic line-up which meant regular players who play abroad like Alex Song would not play in the tournament. Also current head coach of Cameroon, Denis Lavagne, would not be attending the tournament, leaving assistant coach, Emmanuel Bosso to become temporary head coach for the Nehru Cup.

India opened the tournament with a victory against Syria by beating them 2–1. They followed that victory up with a 3–1 victory over Maldives on 25 August. India then followed that match with a draw against Nepal on 28 August. India finished the group stage campaign with a loss against Cameroon in a match that did not matter as both teams were already through to the Final.

Cameroon opened their Nehru Cup campaign on 24 August playing out a draw against Syria 2–2. Cameroon then went back on track to the final by defeating Nepal 5–0 continuing their good form against Maldives by defeating them 3–1. Cameroon then finished their group stage with a victory over India 1–0.

Matches

India

Cameroon

Match

References

Final
Cameroon national football team matches
India national football team matches
2012–13 in Indian football
Nehru
Nehru Cup Final 2012
September 2012 sports events in India